Hutton Roof is a village and civil parish in the South Lakeland district of Cumbria, England, close to Kirkby Lonsdale and Hutton Roof Crags. Historically in Westmorland, the parish includes the hamlet of Newbiggin. In the 2001 census the parish had a population of 193, increasing at the 2011 census to 218.

See also

Listed buildings in Hutton Roof, South Lakeland

Further reading

References

External links
 Cumbria County History Trust: Hutton Roof (Westmorland) (nb: provisional research only – see Talk page)

Villages in Cumbria
Civil parishes in Cumbria